Brandon DiAundre Rutley (born April 9, 1989) is a former Canadian football running back. He played college football at San Jose State. He was a member of the Hamilton Tiger-Cats, Montreal Alouettes, and BC Lions of the Canadian Football League (CFL).

Early life
Rutley was born in Tuscaloosa, Alabama and later lived in Martinez, California. Rutley graduated from Alhambra High School in 2007. Rutley was an all-league running back on the  Alhambra football team and also played on the basketball and track teams.

College career

At San Jose State University, Rutley enrolled in the fall 2007 semester but did not play football. He then played on the San Jose State Spartans football team from 2008 to 2011, the first two seasons under Dick Tomey. As a freshman in 2008, Rutley played all 12 games and ran 79 times for 356 yards and 3 touchdowns, with his longest run being a 60-yarder against #13 Boise State.

In 2009, Rutley played 10 games and had just 59 rushing yards and 2 touchdowns. In 2010, San Jose State had a new head coach Mike MacIntyre. Rutley played all 12 games in 2010 and improved with 129 carries for 461 yards and 4 touchdowns. Rutley stood out for his ability to shed tacklers and make long-distance running plays. Rutley also had 17 receptions for 183 yards, including a 75-yard touchdown reception. As a senior in 2011, Rutley earned second-team All-Western Athletic Conference honors. He played 11 games and had 216 rushes for 903 yards and 12 touchdowns. Among his touchdown runs were one of 66 yards against New Mexico State and 65 yards against UCLA. Rutley also made 27 receptions for 336 yards. In San Jose State's homecoming game against Hawaii, Rutley fumbled a 25-yard reception with about 2:30 to go, but San Jose State rallied to beat Hawaii 28-27 in a game where San Jose State had six turnovers and Hawaii five. Rutley graduated from San Jose State in May 2012 with a B.A. in communication studies.

Professional career

Rutley attended Oakland Raiders minicamp on a tryout basis after being undrafted in the 2012 NFL Draft.

Hamilton Tiger-Cats
On August 22, 2012, Rutley signed with the Hamilton Tiger-Cats of the Canadian Football League. Rutley had 2 rushing attempts for 17 yards.  The Tiger-Cats placed Rutley on injured reserve on September 27, placed Rutley on the non-active list on October 11, and released Rutley on November 2.

Montreal Alouettes
Rutley signed with the CFL's Montreal Alouettes on June 1, 2014. He had one rush attempt for 6 yards with Montreal. The Alouettes released Rutley on August 11. He was re-signed to the Alouettes' practice roster on September 23, 2014. He was promoted to the active roster on November 15, 2014. On February 3, 2015, the Alouettes and Rutley agreed to a two-year contract extension. Rutley saw increased playing time in the 2015 and 2016 seasons as the team's backup running back, carrying the ball 83 times for 454 yards in 2015, and 113 times for 495 yards in 2016. After almost a week as a free agent Rutley re-signed with the Alouettes, on a two-year contract, on February 20, 2017. Rutley only played in five games for the Alouettes in 2017, rushing for 291 yards on 49 carries.

BC Lions 
On January 15, 2018, Rutley was acquired by the BC Lions via trade. He announced his retirement from football on February 26, 2021.

Career statistics

References

External links
BC Lions bio
Montreal Alouettes bio

1989 births
Living people
African-American players of Canadian football
American football running backs
Canadian football running backs
Hamilton Tiger-Cats players
Montreal Alouettes players
People from Martinez, California
Players of American football from California
San Jose State Spartans football players
Players of American football from Alabama
Sportspeople from the San Francisco Bay Area
Sportspeople from Tuscaloosa, Alabama
African-American players of American football
BC Lions players
Canadian football return specialists
21st-century African-American sportspeople
20th-century African-American people